Wrong One to Fuck With is the eighth studio album by American death metal band Dying Fetus, released on June 23, 2017 via Relapse Records.

Track listing

Credits 
Performance and production credits are adapted from the album liner notes.

Personnel

Dying Fetus 
 John Gallagher – guitars, vocals
 Sean Beasley – bass, vocals
 Trey Williams – drums

Production 
 Steve Wright – production
 Dying Fetus – production
 Tony Eichler – mastering

Visual art 
 Sam Shapiro – cover art
 Brendan Barone – cover art
 Orion Landau – layout
 Josh Sisk – photography

Studios 
 WrightWay Studios, Baltimore, MD, US – engineering, mixing
 Goldtone MasterWorks – mastering

Charts

References

External links 
 

2017 albums
Dying Fetus albums
Relapse Records albums